Luizia  is a monospecific genus of sea snails, marine gastropod mollusks in the family Pseudolividae.

Species
Species within the genus Luizia  include:
 Luizia zebrina (A. Adams, 1855)

References

External links

Pseudolividae